Grigory Nikolayevich Korganov (Korganian, Korganashvili) (July 30, 1886 - September 20, 1918) was a Georgian-Armenian Communist activist, one of the 26 Baku Commissars and Bolshevik Party leaders in Azerbaijan during the Russian Revolution.

Biography

Early years 
Korganov was born in Tiflis in the Armenian family of a military officer. From 1907 he attended the Moscow University and headed the Caucasian student association, but he was expelled due to his revolutionary work. After finishing the studies in 1914, he served in the Army as an officer during World War I and was sent to Caucasian Front where he conducted revolutionary propaganda.

October Revolution, Baku Commune and death of Korganov 

After the October Revolution he became Chairman of the Revolutionary Army in Caucasus and, from March 1918, member of the Committee of the Revolutionary Defense of Baku. From April 1918 he became Commissar of the Naval Matters of the Baku Commune and from the spring of 1918 he headed the Soviet Armed Forces. When the Commune was toppled by the Centro Caspian Dictatorship, a British-backed coalition of Dashnaks, SRs and Mensheviks, Korganov and his comrades were captured by British troops and executed by a firing squad between the stations of Pereval and Akhcha-Kuyma of Transcaucasian Railroad.

References
Êîðãàíîâ Ãðèãîðèé Íèêîëàåâè÷ at www.booksite.ru

1886 births
1918 deaths
Armenian atheists
Armenian communists
Armenian revolutionaries
Articles containing video clips
Azerbaijani people of Armenian descent
Azerbaijani communists
Executed politicians
Georgian people of Armenian descent
Old Bolsheviks
Politicians from Tbilisi
Russian military personnel of World War I
People executed by the British military by firing squad